The country of the Central African Republic in Africa has the following national parks and other protected areas.

National parks 
André Félix National Park
Bamingui-Bangoran National Park
Dzanga-Ndoki National Park
Mbaéré Bodingué National Park
St Floris National Park
Around 1,173,434 km² total

Faunal reserves
Aouk Aoukale Faunal Reserve
Nana Barya Faunal Reserve
Ouandjia Vakaga Faunal Reserve
Yata Ngaya Faunal Reserve
Zemongo Faunal Reserve

Nature reserves 
Vassako Bolo Strict Nature Reserve
Chinko Nature Reserve

Other reserves
Dzanga-Sangha Special Reserve

See also
 Tourism in the Central African Republic

External links 
 World Institute for Nature and Environment

Protected
Central African Republic

Protected areas